General elections were held in Sweden on 16 September 1979. Although the Swedish Social Democratic Party remained the largest party, winning 154 of the 349 seats in the Riksdag, the liberal interim government of Ola Ullsten was succeeded by another centre-right coalition government composed of the People's Party, the Moderate Party and the Centre Party, led by Centre Party leader Thorbjörn Fälldin. The three parties together won 175 seats, compared to the 174 won by the Social Democrats and Communists. It was the only time that non-socialist parties retained power in an election between 1928 and 2010. The Moderates dramatically increased their representation in the Riksdag, becoming the largest party of the non-socialist bloc, a position they maintained until 2022.

Despite the unexpected victory, the coalition split in 1981 when the Moderates withdrew support in protest at Fälldin's tax policies, which they viewed as "too leftist". Despite not being the leader of the coalition party with the most seats, Fälldin had been the designate Prime Minister since his earlier resignation in 1978, upon disagreement over the question of nuclear power.

Results

Seat distribution

By municipality

References

General elections in Sweden
Sweden
General
Sweden